Aurora University was a Catholic university in Shanghai from 1903 to 1952.

The university was founded on 27February 1903 by Joseph Ma Xiangbo, S.J. and French Jesuits. In 1905, Ma resigned to establish Fudan University, and Aurora was thereafter run by French Jesuits until the Communist Revolution. From 1908 onwards, it was located in Shanghai's French Concession. "By the 1940s, the institution had grown to become one of the largest, if not the largest, among Shanghai’s private universities and included faculties of Law, Medicine, Sciences, Applied Sciences, and Literature, along with a Preparatory Course,Women’s College, nursing program, dental training, a renowned natural sciences museum (Le Musée Heude), and a number of associated collèges and lycées in Shanghai and other cities throughout Jiangnan."

In 1952, Aurora University merged into East China Normal University and Fudan University, while the chemistry department was absorbed by the newly founded East China Institute of Chemical Technology and the medical school joined the Shanghai Second Medical College.

Notable alumni
 Yosef Tekoah, former president of the Ben-Gurion University of the Negev

See also
 List of Jesuit sites

References

Aurora University (Shanghai)
Defunct universities and colleges in Shanghai
Catholic universities and colleges in China
Educational institutions established in 1903
1903 establishments in China
1952 disestablishments in China
Educational institutions disestablished in 1952